Jens Blidorf Frederiksen is a Greenlandic politician. He is the former leader of the Democrats and former Minister for Housing, Infrastructure and Transport, and former Deputy-Premier.

References

Living people
Democrats (Greenland) politicians
Government ministers of Greenland
21st-century Danish politicians
Year of birth missing (living people)